Mesaque Geremias Djú (born 18 March 1999) is a Portuguese professional footballer who plays as a forward for Greek Super League club OFI. Born in Guinea Bissau, he is a youth international for Portugal.

Career

Benfica B
After joining Benfica as a youth player in 2010, Djú made his debut for Benfica B as a 63rd minute substitute in a 4–1 loss to Braga B on 14 May 2017. During his time at Benfica B, he made eight LigaPro appearances, scoring once.

West Ham United
On 30 January 2019, Djú signed for English club West Ham United on a free transfer.

OFI
On 28 September 2022, Djú signed for Greek club OFI on a two-year deal.

Honours
Benfica
Campeonato Nacional de Juniores: 2017–18
2016–17 UEFA Youth League runner-up: 2016–17

Portugal U17
UEFA European Under-17 Championship: 2016

Portugal U19
UEFA European Under-19 Championship: 2018

Individual
 UEFA European Under-19 Championship Team of the Tournament: 2017

References

External links
 
 

1999 births
Living people
Sportspeople from Bissau
Portuguese footballers
Portugal youth international footballers
Bissau-Guinean footballers
Bissau-Guinean emigrants to Portugal
Portuguese people of Bissau-Guinean descent
Association football forwards
S.L. Benfica B players
Liga Portugal 2 players
West Ham United F.C. players
OFI Crete F.C. players
Super League Greece players
Portuguese expatriate footballers
Bissau-Guinean expatriate footballers
Bissau-Guinean expatriate sportspeople in Portugal
Bissau-Guinean expatriate sportspeople in England
Bissau-Guinean expatriate sportspeople in Greece
Black Portuguese sportspeople
Expatriate footballers in England
Portuguese expatriate sportspeople in England
Expatriate footballers in Greece
Portuguese expatriate sportspeople in Greece